The Battle of Kivinebb was fought on March 11, 1555, between Finnish forces of Sweden commanded by Jöns Månsson Ulfsparre (Finnish name Juho Maununpoika) numbering 500 on one side, and on the other side a Russian army led by Ivan Grigoryevich Bibikov numbering up to 13,000 and consisting mostly of militiamen from Zemshchina. Despite being severely outnumbered, Swedish forces won the battle due to superior knowledge of the region and using skis for mobility. The battle is briefly mentioned in the Lebedev Chronicle, which says that in 1555 Ivan Bibikov with a number of common men was sent to push Swedes to exchange some Russian citizens who were forcibly held in Sweden and to punish the Swedes for attacking the nearest Russian settlements, but was defeated.

References

Conflicts in 1555
1555 in Russia
Kivinebb
Kivinebb (1555)